The Revenge of the Whore is a 2012 television film, based on the novel Die Kastellanin written by Iny Lorentz. It is the sequel of the 2010 television film The Whore. The title song is "Mna Na H-Eireann" which means "Women of Ireland" in the Irish language, by the French singer Nolwenn Leroy. The film was produced in Austria and the Czech Republic, by Josef Aichholzer and cost €5.6 million (about US$7.53 million). It aired in Germany February 28, 2012 on Sat.1.

Plot 
Marie played by Alexandra Neldel and her husband Michel Adler played by Bert Tischendorf have a happy life until Michel has to go to war against the Hussites for König Sigismund but does not come back. Marie does not believe that he is dead and starts her journey to find out what really happened to him.

It is sometimes displayed - on recording and when digitally streamed - as The Revenge of the Siren in English-translated versions (and similarly for its predecessor, The Royal Siren, and successor, The Legacy of the Siren, in the series.)

Cast

References

External links 
 
 

2012 television films
2012 films
Films based on German novels
Television shows based on German novels
German sequel films
German television films
2010s German-language films
German-language television shows
Films set in the 15th century
Films set in the Holy Roman Empire
Sat.1 original programming